Wakayama may refer to:
Wakayama Prefecture, a prefecture of Japan
Wakayama (city), the capital city of Wakayama Prefecture, Japan
Wakayama Station, a train station in Wakayama, Wakayama
Wakayama University, a national university in Wakayama, Wakayama

People with the surname
, Japanese writer
, Japanese voice actor and actor
, Japanese voice actresses
, Japanese actor
, Japanese idol

Japanese-language surnames